The naval history of Korea dates back thousands of years since the prehistoric times when simple fishing ships were used. Military naval history dates back to the Three Kingdoms period and Unified Silla dynasties of Korea in the 7th century. Because of the constant coastal attacks by the Wa Japanese and other barbarian tribes, Korean shipbuilding excelled to counter these threats as a result. During the Unified Silla period, Jang Bogo, a merchant, rose as an admiral and created the first maritime trading within East Asian countries. During the Goryeo dynasty, sturdy wooden ships were built and used to fight pirates. Korean shipbuilding again excelled during the Imjin war, when Admiral Yi defeated the advancing Japanese fleets.

Today, South Korea is the world's largest shipbuilding nation and also the world's builder and exporter of ships. The South Korean Navy is concentrating its efforts to increasing its number, develop new ships, and become a blue-water navy by 2020.

Three Kingdoms of Korea period
Ships were developed and used since the Three Kingdoms of Korea period. Because of the abundance of coastal waters surrounding the Korean peninsula, Koreans developed simple fishing ships to take advantage of the resources.

Baekje, one of the kingdoms, first began expanding its navy and trading products by sea. Baekje also provided the link to spread Buddhism and Korean and Chinese culture to Japan. However, with the rise of Goguryeo's power and Gwanggeto the Great, Baekje's navy was soon defeated near the end of the 4th century Goguryeo also repelled numerous Chinese naval forces during its wars with China. During the Goguryeo-Sui Wars, Goguryeo defeated an invading Chinese fleet in 598, in the Bohai Sea.

North-South States period
After the defeat of Goguryeo with an alliance with Tang China in 668, Silla unified the Korean peninsula. During this time, Korean culture and philosophy reached its height, and Unified Silla maintained a large trading network with both China and Japan.

Silla, like previous Korean kingdoms, maintained powerful control over its trade routes and oceanic territory as Japanese and Chinese pirates began to harass trade routes over sea. From 828 to 846, however, a Silla merchant named Jang Bogo, rose to prominence and gathered a navy to repel pirates and control Korean trade routes. Jang eventually became a maritime commissioner on Wando Island.

With stable control over maritime rights, Silla prospered in the peace of its rule. However, internal strife weakened it and after wars during the Later Three Kingdoms period, fell the Goryeo in 935.

Goryeo Dynasty period
Korean shipbuilding again excelled during the Goryeo Dynasty. In the 11th century, Goryeo shipbuilders developed the kwason, or spear vessel. This ships was designed to ram and destroy Japanese pirate vessels, who were attacking coastal Korean cities. Goryeo ships were both large and strong in terms of size and durability and the largest could carry 200 or more fighting marines.

Choe Mu-seon, a Goryeo scientist, developed Korean cannon in the 14th century. They were soon developed to be used on Goryeo battleships and were used with success against the Mongol invasion. During the Mongol invasion of Japan in 1281, about 900 Goryeo ships that assisted the invasion with Yuan Mongol vessels, only a few Goryeo ships were damaged while most of the invasion force of Mongol vessels were destroyed in the "kamikaze", or divine wind. By 1380 the Goryeo navy had implemented widespread use of cannons on board their ships attacked and a large wako fleet off of the Geum River which resulted in the near annihilation of almost the entire wako fleet. The world's first naval artillery battle took place off the coast of Korea. In the Battle of Chinpo (1380), 80 Koryo warships, equipped with firearms invented by Choi Mu-son, sank 500 Japanese wako, or pirate ships. Also in 1383, Admiral Jeong Ji destroyed 17 wako pirate vessels using shipboard cannons. In 1389 a total of 300 Waegu ships were destroyed and over a hundred of Korean prisoners liberated in a raid on Tsushima ordered by Yi Seonggye.

Joseon Dynasty period

During the Joseon Dynasty, however, the navy and maritime operations fell into disuse, while fishing ships continued to operate and prosper. Because of the relative peace during the Joseon dynasty, the entire military itself weakened and was ignored. Also, with the policy of Korean kings that emphasized agriculture and Confucian ideals, the Korean navy along with the rest of the Korean military weakened steadily.

However, in 1419, King Sejong sent Yi Jong-mu to destroy the Japanese on Tsushima Island in the Oei Invasion as a response to Japanese Wokou raids on Korean coastal cities. Yi took 227 Korean ships and about 17,000 soldiers landed and attacked Japanese settlements on Tsushima Island, destroying crops, killing Japanese islanders and pirates, and plundering ships. The So clan, the ruling seat of Japan, surrendered and requested to pay tributes. Korea allowed the So clan to be able to trade with Korean coastal harbors under the condition that Japanese pirates be suppressed.

Korea eventually developed strong wooden ships called panokseons that made up the backbone of the Joseon navy. In the 15th century, under the decree of King Sejong, more powerful cannons were developed and tested. Used on battleships, the cannons proved to be a great success during actions against Japanese pirate ships. Panokseons and the Korean navy were most widely used during the Japanese invasions of Korea (1592-1598) when Admiral Yi Sun-sin's brilliant strategy defeated Japanese fleets. Admiral Yi also developed the turtle ship upon an older design.

By the end of 19th century, the Joseon Navy had no significant naval force other than coast defense fortresses. Although there was an attempt to modernize the navy by establishing a royal naval school, the Joseon Navy was brought to an end in 1895. In 1903, the government of the Korean Empire purchased its first modern war ship, the Yangmu. Korean naval tradition was disrupted after Korea was annexed by the Empire of Japan in 1910.

During the Japanese occupation period (1910-1945), the Imperial Japanese Navy built a naval base (Chinkai Guard District) in southern Korea (at present-day Jinhae).

Modern Korean navies

The modern South Korean Navy has about 68,000 regular personnel and 170 commissioned ships including submarines and auxiliary fleets. The ROK navy is participating in peacekeeping operations. The ROK navy has been concentrating efforts to develop and build more powerful ships to defend national maritime rights. The South Korean navy plans on becoming a blue-water navy by 2020 as well and is developing experimental vessels under projects like the Korean Destroyer eXperimental (KDX) program and the Dokdo class landing platform experimental.

The North Korean Navy is used to defend the waters of North Korea. However, not much is known about the North Korean navy and what equipment is used.

References

See also
 Republic of Korea Navy
 Military history of Korea